INS Sindhughosh (S55) is the lead ship of her class of diesel-electric submarines of the Indian Navy.

The submarine was commissioned on 30 April 1986 in Riga, Latvia under the command of Commander K C Varghese. The submarine is diesel-powered and has a total of six motors.

Service history

Collision with a foreign vessel (2008)
INS Sindhughosh collided with a foreign merchant vessel - MV Leeds Castle - while trying to surface in the seas north of Mumbai on 7 January 2008. The submarine was taking part in fleet level war games when the accident occurred. The boat has reportedly suffered slight damage to the conning tower area. Naval officials  said the submarine was submerged and had its radars off and periscope down when it slammed into the merchant vessel off India's Diu Island,  from Mumbai. The boat was apparently maintaining total radio and radar silence to escape detection, when the accident took place. It has also been reported that the indigenously developed USHUS sonar malfunctioned and played a direct role in the accident. A Navy officer, on condition of anonymity, stated that the MV Leeds Castle was in restricted waters and in that area the ocean depth is not great and thus the reason for the mishap. The submarine was towed to a naval dockyard at Mumbai and a Board of Inquiry was ordered to probe the mishap. The crew of INS Sindhughosh had a miraculous escape as the accident was caused at surface level. The reports of structural damage is a cause of concern. Normally the submarine has two hulls. But any damage to structure means checking the entire review of the whole structure.

Fire damage (2013)
The navy did not release any details of the extent of damage on Sindhughosh.

Runs aground (2014)
On 17 January 2014, INS Sindhughosh ran aground due to the low tide, while returning to Naval Dockyard, Mumbai.

References

External links 
INS Sindhughosh and her collision at Bharat-Rakshak

Sindhughosh-class submarines
Attack submarines
Ships built in the Soviet Union
1985 ships
Submarines of India
Indian submarine accidents